Mount Werner is a mountain summit in the Park Range of the Rocky Mountains of North America. The mountain was renamed in 1964 in honor of skier Buddy Werner.

Mountain
It has five peaks (from lowest to highest), Christie Peak, Thunderhead Peak, Sunshine Peak, Storm Peak, and Mount Werner.

Formerly known as Storm Mountain, it was renamed in 1965 in honor of Buddy Werner, an Olympian from Steamboat Springs who was killed in an avalanche in Switzerland in April 1964.

Mount Werner stands within the watershed of the Yampa River, which drains into the Green River, the Colorado River, and thence into the Gulf of California in Mexico.

Steamboat Ski Resort
It is serviced by the Silver Bullet gondola lift and several chairlifts. It regularly receives some of the highest levels of snow in Colorado. Much of the mountain and the resort are contained within the Routt National Forest.

It is the home mountain of world champion and Olympic bronze medalist snowboarder Arielle Gold.

Historical names
 Mount Werner – 1964 
 Storm Mountain

See also

 List of Colorado mountain ranges
 List of Colorado mountain summits
 List of Colorado fourteeners
 List of Colorado 4000 meter prominent summits
 List of the most prominent summits of Colorado
 List of Colorado county high points

References

External links

 Steamboat resort (official website)
 Interactive maps and three live video "Mountain Cams" of the Steamboat Ski Resort on Mt. Werner

Mountains of Colorado
Mountains of Routt County, Colorado
Routt National Forest
North American 3000 m summits